The Hawaiʻi Rainbow Wāhine beach volleyball team, more commonly known as the Hawaii SandBows, is the beach volleyball team representing the University of Hawaiʻi at Mānoa in NCAA Division I women's play.

History
The university has a rich volleyball tradition. They have had three head coaches since the team's inception in 2012. In 2014 under head coach Scott Wong, they appeared in the NCAA Division I Final Four. During the 2015 season, they ranked first in attendance among all Division 1 volleyball beach programs. The "SandBows" averaged over 330 fans, each, for six home matches. With Collegiate Beach's inception, the Bows have been ranked in every AVCA Top 10 Poll to date. The university plays its home matches in the—five courted—The Clarence T.C. Ching Athletics Complex.

Angelica Ljungqvist is (was?) the current head coach of the team. She assumed the role in August 2020 after the indoor and beach programs merged in a financial decision stemming from the COVID-19 pandemic.

Year-by-year results

Notes

Home Court/Practice and Training facilities
Queen's Beach located on the Waikiki shore is the home court for the women's beach volleyball team.
Clarence T. C. Ching Athletics Complex is the practice facility for the women's beach volleyball team.

See also
 List of NCAA women's beach volleyball programs

References

External links

 
Beach volleyball clubs established in 2012
2012 establishments in Hawaii